The Fourth Amendment of the Constitution of South Africa made two technical changes relating to the calling of provincial elections and the choice of delegates to the National Council of Provinces. It was enacted by the Parliament of South Africa, signed by Acting President Thabo Mbeki on 17 March 1999, and came into force two days later. It was signed and came into force simultaneously with the Fifth Amendment; the two amendments were separated because the Fourth involved provincial matters and had to be passed by the National Council of Provinces while the Fifth did not.

Provisions 
The Act made two technical modifications to the Constitution. The first was to clarify that, when the term of a provincial legislature is due to expire, the Premier may issue the proclamation calling an election either before or after the term actually expires. The Fifth Amendment made the same change for elections to the National Assembly. The second was to modify the formula for the allocation of delegates' seats in the National Council of Provinces to parties.

Formal title
The official short title of the amendment is "Constitution Fourth Amendment Act of 1999". It was originally titled "Constitution of the Republic of South Africa Amendment Act, 1999" and numbered as Act No. 3 of 1999, but the Citation of Constitutional Laws Act, 2005 renamed it and abolished the practice of giving Act numbers to constitutional amendments.

External links

 Official text (PDF)

Amendments of the Constitution of South Africa
1999 in South African law